The Henry Phipps House was a mansion located on 1063 Fifth Avenue in the Upper East Side in  Manhattan, New York City.

It was constructed for Henry Phipps and demolished after his death in 1930. The entire marble facade was however stripped and shipped off by his widow to their daughter Amy's country estate “Templeton” to a field in Brookville, New York.

Parts of the marble were later repurposed to renovate "Templeton" in 2013.

References

Further reading

External links 
 Daytonian in Manhattan: The Lost Henry Phipps Mansion -- 5th Avenue and 87th Street 

Fifth Avenue
Upper East Side
Houses in Manhattan
Demolished buildings and structures in Manhattan